The Nové Mlýny reservoirs are three reservoirs behind the Nové Mlýny Dam  on the Thaya River in the Czech Republic. The lower reservoir, 1,668 ha in area, is the Novomlýnská (or Nové Mlýny) Reservoir, the middle reservoir, 1,031 ha, is the Věstonice Reservoir and the upper reservoir, 528 ha, is the Mušovská (or Mušov) Reservoir.

References
Czech Republic Environmental Law Service - The Nove Mlyny reservoirs
Dam Nové Mlýny
Littoral 0+ fish assemblages in three reservoirs of the Nové Mlýny Dam (Czech Republic)

Reservoirs in the Czech Republic

Lake groups of the Czech Republic